This is a list of by-elections to the Senedd (Welsh Parliament; ; formerly known as the National Assembly for Wales).
Where seats changed political party at the by-election, the result is highlighted.

*Peter Law left the Labour Party and sat as an independent prior to his death. The by-election was won by his widow, but is classed as an independent gain from Labour.

See also
 List of by-elections to the Scottish Parliament
 Regional Member changes to the Senedd

References

Welsh Assembly by-elections
Lists of by-elections in the United Kingdom

By